The United Nations Educational, Scientific and Cultural Organization (UNESCO) designates World Heritage Sites of outstanding universal value to cultural or natural heritage which  have been nominated by countries which are signatories to the UNESCO World Heritage Convention, established in 1972. Cultural heritage consists of monuments (such as architectural works, monumental sculptures, or inscriptions), groups of buildings, and sites (including archaeological sites). Natural features (consisting of physical and biological formations), geological and physiographical formations (including habitats of threatened species of animals and plants), and natural sites which are important from the point of view of science, conservation or natural beauty, are defined as natural heritage. Armenia ratified the convention on 5 September 1993.

, Armenia has three sites on the list, all of which are monasteries, churches or related religious sites. The first property listed in Armenia was the Haghpat Monastery, in 1996. In 2000, the site was extended to include the Sanahin Monastery. In 2000, two further properties were added, the Cathedral and Churches of Echmiatsin together with the archaeological site of Zvartnots, and the Monastery of Geghard and the Upper Azat Valley. All three sites are cultural sites. There are additional four sites on the tentative list. 


World Heritage Sites 
UNESCO lists sites under ten criteria; each entry must meet at least one of the criteria. Criteria i through vi are cultural, and vii through x are natural.

Tentative list 
In addition to the sites inscribed on the World Heritage list, member states can maintain a list of tentative sites that they may consider for nomination. Nominations for the World Heritage list are only accepted if the site has previously been listed on the tentative list. , Armenia has four such sites on its tentative list.

See also
List of Intangible Cultural Heritage in Armenia
Tourism in Armenia

References

External links
UNESCO World Heritage in Armenia

Armenia
World Heritage Sites
World Heritage Sites
 
World Heritage Sites